Lomseggi is a mountain on the border of Skjåk Municipality and Lom Municipality in Innlandet county, Norway. The mountain is surrounded by several other notable mountains including Storhøi to the south; Lendfjellet, Moldulhøi, and Sandgrovhøi to the southwest; Hestdalshøgdi and Tverrfjellet to the west.

See also
List of mountains of Norway

References

Skjåk
Lom, Norway
Mountains of Innlandet